Pierre Célor (19 April 1902, Tulle, Corrèze – 6 April 1957) was a member of the French Communist Party from 1923, becoming one of the four secretaries of its Central Committee in 1929, beside Maurice Thorez and Henri Barbé.  However, he fell into disgrace after the Comintern expelled him from the PCF and in 1942 he joined the Parti populaire français (PPF) of Jacques Doriot. 

After the Second World War, he was sentenced to seven years in prison for collaboration but was granted amnesty and was released in 1947.  He participated in the anti-Communist review Est&Ouest and became close to traditional Catholics.

Sources 

 Philippe Robrieux, Histoire intérieure du parti communiste, T1 et T4, Fayard, Paris.

1902 births
1957 deaths
People from Tulle
Politicians of the French Third Republic
French collaborators with Nazi Germany
French Communist Party politicians
Former Marxists